Webster University Utah is a branch of Webster University, an independent, accredited, non-profit, private university in St. Louis, Missouri. Its campus location is at Hill Air Force Base, comprising only one of Webster's many campuses around the world.

Webster opened its first Utah campus at Hill Air Force Base in 2000, and currently offers master's degree programs. Webster is accredited by The Higher Learning Commission and is a member of the North Central Association.

Designed to accommodate working schedules, classes meet one night a week from 5:30 p.m. to 9:30 p.m. With five nine-week terms per year, most master's degree can be completed in 15–30 months by taking one or two courses each term.

Recognitions

U.S. News & World Report consistently ranks Webster in the top tier of Midwestern universities in its category. In 2002 Webster was recognized for its outstanding contributions to military education by the Council of College and Military Educators. Money Magazine rated Webster as one of the ten best commuter colleges in the United States.

With the opening of the Shanghai campus in 1996, Webster University became the first American university approved by the Chinese government to offer the M.B.A. in China.  Webster is ranked as having one of the highest graduate business enrollments in the United States by AACSB International, the Association to Advance Collegiate Schools of Business.

External links
Webster University Utah Campuses website
Webster University

Private universities and colleges in Utah
Business schools in Utah
Universities and colleges in Utah County, Utah
Universities and colleges in Weber County, Utah
Webster University